The statue of Benito Juárez is installed in Cholula, Puebla's Plaza de la Concordia, in Mexico.

References

External links

 

Monuments and memorials in Puebla
Outdoor sculptures in Cholula, Puebla
Sculptures of men in Mexico
Statues in Puebla
Cholula